Hayden's sedge is a common name for several plants and may refer to:

Carex haydenii, native to Canada and the United States
Carex haydeniana